Dark Connection is the third studio album by Finnish power metal band Beast in Black, released on 29 October 2021. Similar to their debut album Berserk, several songs reference well known science fiction series like Blade Runner. The album charted well, ranking number one in their home country, and did well in Sweden, Switzerland, Austria, and Germany. Four videos were produced for the tracks "Moonlight Rendezvous", "Hardcore", "One Night in Tokyo" and "Blade Runner".

Reception
Upon its release, Dark Connection was praised by critics. Blabbermouth.net spoke positively on the release, mentioning that it is "bursting with absolutely blistering riffs and guitar work", combined with "deeply infectious vocal work and choruses", concluding that "At the end of the day, in terms of art and creativity, Beast in Black has hit the ball out of the park with album number three." 

Sonic Perspectives praised it, commenting: "Having been at the forefront of bringing the worlds of melodic metal and 80s post-disco/synth pop together for the past decade, former Battle Beast guitarist and mastermind Anton Kabanen, and his current fold of veteran metal warriors, usher in their latest studio venture in effortless fashion, proving that what is old can indeed become new." Games, Brains & a Headbanging Life called it a very satisfying listen, besides a few tracks that don't have as much oomph as others. It's "one that shows just how much they've grown and just how bright their future is." A reviewer from Metal Storm praised it, and stated it as being the bands strongest album yet; Praising all aspects such as performance, production, overall sound, and album cohesion. MetalMusicPlanet deemed it as being "Absolutely essential listening for fans of the genre and for anyone who just loves any kind of melodic Rock or Metal music."

Tracklisting

Personnel
Beast in Black
Anton Kabanen – lead guitar, backing vocals, keyboards, orchestrations
Yannis Papadopoulos – vocals
Kasperi Heikkinen – rhythm guitar
Máté Molnár – bass
Atte Palokangas – drums
Additional personnel
Cynthia – keyboards
Mikael Salo – backing vocals
Paolo Ribaldini – backing vocals
Production
Roman Ismailov – artwork
Anton Kabanen – producer, recording, mixing
Yannis Papadopoulos – mixing (assistant)
Jarmo Katila – photography
Toni Kilpinen – photography (editing)
Emil Pohjalainen – mastering
Janne Peltonen – layout

Charts

References

External links
Official music videos
 
 
 

2021 albums
Beast in Black albums
Power metal albums by Finnish artists